Survivor NZ: Thailand was the second and final season of Survivor NZ, a television series based on the popular reality game show Survivor.  This season took place in Khao Laem National Park in Thailand. Here, 18 contestants fought to survive for 39 days to try and win $250,000.

This season featured several alterations from the previous season, Survivor NZ: Nicaragua. The cash prize was increased from $100,000 to $250,000 and Redemption Island — which allowed voted out contestants to return to the game — was removed. This season also introduced hidden immunity idols, small trinkets that, when played on a castaway after the votes were cast at Tribal Council but before they were read, negated all votes cast against them at that Tribal Council, and the Outpost, where tribal representatives were to compete in head-to-head competitions for rewards and tote.

Contestants
Two of the eighteen contestants — Francesca "Franky" March and Kaysha Whakarau — were chosen by fans. In the premiere episode, it was revealed that David "Dave" Lipanovic and Matthew "Matt" Hancock were friends and had attended high school together.

Season summary
Eighteen new castaways arrived in Thailand and were divided into two tribes of nine: Chani and Khangkhaw. Chani proved to be inefficient in challenges whilst Khangkhaw dominated (though their members frequently bickered amongst themselves). After a tribe swap, JT's health started to deteriorate, and he opted to pull himself from the game as the new Khangkhaw and Chani tribes took opportunities to vote out newer members of their groups in an effort to retain a majority at the tribal merger.

When the tribes merged, the original Khangkhaw members, under the control of Lisa, used their majority to systematically eliminate the former Chani members. Khangkhaw's rocky tribe dynamic caused their numbers to dwindle as Dave stayed alive. He won a crucial immunity challenge and maneuvered his way to the Final Tribal Council alongside Tess and Lisa. At the Final Tribal Council, Dave was criticized for keeping his friendship with Matt being viewed as an unfair advantage in the game. Tess had many friends on the jury, though she was deemed to be an inferior strategist to Lisa, who was named the Sole Survivor in a 4-3-0 decision.

Voting history

References

External links
 Official website

New Zealand 2
2018 New Zealand television seasons
Television shows filmed in Thailand